Give and Take is an album by Mike Stern, released in 1997 through Atlantic Records. The album reached a peak position of number twelve on Billboard Top Jazz Albums chart.

Track listing

Personnel

Credits adapted from AllMusic.

Musicians
 Mike Stern – guitar
 John Patitucci – acoustic bass
 Gil Goldstein – piano
 Jack DeJohnette – drums
 Don Alias – percussion
 Michael Brecker – tenor saxophone
 David Sanborn – alto saxophone

Technical personnel
 Gil Goldstein – production
 James Farber – engineering, mixing
 Matthew "Boomer" La Monica – engineering
 Greg Calbi – mastering
 Andrew Page – assistant engineer
 John R. Reigart III – assistant engineer
 Tom Schick – assistant engineer
 David Swope – assistant engineer
 Lynn Kowalewski – art direction, design
 Norman Jean Roy – photography

References

1997 albums
Atlantic Records albums
Mike Stern albums